

Skaters
The statistics listed include the 2021–22 NHL regular season and 2022 playoffs.

All-time leaders (skaters)
Active skaters (during 2022–23 NHL season) are listed in boldface.

Regular season: Points

Regular season: Points per game

Minimum 500 points

 Wayne Gretzky, 1.921
 Mario Lemieux, 1.883
 Mike Bossy, 1.497
 Connor McDavid, 1.431
 Bobby Orr, 1.393
 Marcel Dionne, 1.314
 Sidney Crosby, 1.272
 Peter Stastny, 1.268
 Peter Forsberg, 1.250
 Kent Nilsson, 1.241
 Phil Esposito, 1.240
 Guy Lafleur, 1.202
 Joe Sakic, 1.191
 Dale Hawerchuk, 1.186
 Pat LaFontaine, 1.171
 Evgeni Malkin, 1.168
 Steve Yzerman, 1.159
 Eric Lindros, 1.138
 Bernie Federko, 1.130
 Artemi Panarin, 1.120
 Denis Savard, 1.119
 Jari Kurri, 1.118
 Bryan Trottier, 1.114
 Gilbert Perreault, 1.113
 Pavel Bure, 1.110

Regular season: Goals

Regular season: Goals per game

Minimum: 200 goals

 Mike Bossy, 0.762
 Mario Lemieux, 0.754
 Cy Denneny, 0.751
 Babe Dye, 0.742
 Pavel Bure, 0.623
 Alexander Ovechkin, 0.612
 Wayne Gretzky, 0.601
 Brett Hull, 0.584
 Bobby Hull, 0.574
 Tim Kerr, 0.565
 Rick Martin, 0.561
 Phil Esposito, 0.559
 Maurice Richard, 0.556
 Cam Neely, 0.544
 Marcel Dionne, 0.542
 Pat LaFontaine, 0.541
 Steven Stamkos, 0.522
 Rick Vaive, 0.503
 Michel Goulet, 0.503
 Nels Stewart, 0.498
 Guy Lafleur, 0.497
 Mike Gartner, 0.494
 Dino Ciccarelli, 0.493
 Howie Morenz, 0.493
 Blaine Stoughton, 0.490

Regular season: Power Play goals

 Alexander Ovechkin, 285
 Dave Andreychuk, 274
 Brett Hull, 265
 Teemu Selanne, 255
 Luc Robitaille, 247
 Phil Esposito, 246
 Brendan Shanahan, 237
 Mario Lemieux, 236
 Marcel Dionne, 234
 Dino Ciccarelli, 232
 Mike Gartner, 217  Jaromir Jagr, 217
 Joe Nieuwendyk, 215
 Keith Tkachuk, 212
 Gordie Howe, 211
 Joe Sakic, 205
 Wayne Gretzky, 204
 Steve Yzerman, 202
 Mark Recchi, 200
 Brian Bellows, 198
 Jarome Iginla, 197
 Pierre Turgeon, 190
 Ron Francis, 188
 Pat Verbeek, 186
 Jeremy Roenick, 184

Regular season: Short-handed goals

 Wayne Gretzky, 73
 Mark Messier, 63
 Steve Yzerman, 50
 Mario Lemieux, 49
 Butch Goring, 39  Dave Poulin, 39  Jari Kurri, 39
  Sergei Fedorov, 36
 Theoren Fleury, 35  Dirk Graham, 35
  Pavel Bure, 34  Derek Sanderson, 34  Marian Hossa, 34
  Brian Rolston, 33  Guy Carbonneau, 33  Brad Marchand, 33
  Peter Bondra, 32  Bobby Clarke, 32  Joe Sakic, 32  Dave Keon, 32
  Bill Barber, 31   Mats Sundin, 31
  Bob Pulford, 30
  Martin St. Louis, 29  Russ Courtnall, 29  Craig MacTavish, 29  Mike Modano, 29  Esa Tikkanen, 29

Regular season: Game-winning goals

Jaromir Jagr, 135
 Alexander Ovechkin, 121
 Gordie Howe, 121
 Phil Esposito, 118
 Brett Hull, 110  Teemu Selanne, 110
  Patrick Marleau, 109  Brendan Shanahan, 109
  Jarome Iginla, 101
 Guy Lafleur, 98  Bobby Hull, 98 
  Mats Sundin, 96
 Steve Yzerman, 94 
 Sergei Fedorov, 93  Joe Nieuwendyk, 93
  Mark Messier, 92  Mike Modano, 92  Jeremy Roenick, 92  Johnny Bucyk, 92 
  Wayne Gretzky, 91  Mark Recchi, 91
  Mike Gartner, 90
 Luc Robitaille, 89
 Joe Sakic, 86  Pierre Turgeon, 86  Daniel Sedin, 86

Regular season: Overtime goals
If a game is tied after regulation time (which lasts three 20-minute periods), there will be a period of "overtime" to decide the winner. The player who scores during these extra five minutes is given the overtime goal. All overtime in the NHL is sudden death—meaning the first team to score is the winner—so the player who scores in overtime also has the game-winning goal.

Alexander Ovechkin, 24
Jaromir Jagr, 19  
Sidney Crosby, 18
 Ilya Kovalchuk, 17  Brad Marchand, 17 
 Max Pacioretty, 16  Patrik Elias, 16  Daniel Sedin, 16
  John Tavares, 15  Jonathan Toews, 15  Brent Burns, 15  Sergei Fedorov, 15  Marian Hossa, 15  Mats Sundin, 15  Jeff Carter, 15
  Olli Jokinen, 13  Steve Thomas, 13  Scott Niedermayer, 13  Evgeni Malkin, 13  Connor McDavid, 13
 Ryan O'Reilly, 12  Daniel Briere, 12  Brett Hull, 12  Brendan Shanahan, 12  Taylor Hall, 12  Jakub Voracek, 12  Nels Stewart, 12

Regular season: Empty net goals

 Wayne Gretzky, 56
 Marian Hossa, 40
 Alexander Ovechkin, 39
 Mario Lemieux, 33
 Jarome Iginla, 32
 Eric Staal, 31
 Joe Thornton, 29
 Brad Marchand, 28  Pavel Bure, 28  Bryan Trottier, 28
  Teemu Selanne, 26
  Mark Messier, 25  Blake Wheeler, 25  Patrick Kane, 25  Patrice Bergeron, 25
  Zach Parise, 24  Keith Tkachuk, 24
   David Backes, 23  Evgeni Malkin, 23  Sidney Crosby, 23  Ilya Kovalchuk, 23  Daniel Alfredsson, 23  Marcel Dionne, 23
  Rick Nash, 22  Jaromir Jagr, 22  Steve Yzerman, 22

Regular season: Assists

 Wayne Gretzky, 1,963
 Ron Francis, 1,249
 Mark Messier, 1,193
 Ray Bourque, 1,169
 Jaromir Jagr, 1,155
 Paul Coffey, 1,135
 Joe Thornton, 1,109
 Adam Oates, 1,079
 Steve Yzerman, 1,063
 Gordie Howe, 1,049
 Marcel Dionne, 1,040
 Mario Lemieux, 1,033
 Joe Sakic, 1,016
 Doug Gilmour, 964
 Mark Recchi, 956
 Al MacInnis, 934
 Larry Murphy, 929
 Stan Mikita, 926
 Bryan Trottier, 901
 Phil Housley, 894
 Sidney Crosby, 892
 Dale Hawerchuk, 891
 Nicklas Lidstrom, 878
 Phil Esposito, 873
 Denis Savard, 865
 Bobby Clarke, 852
 Henrik Sedin, 830
 Alex Delvecchio, 825
 Gilbert Perreault, 814
 Johnny Bucyk, 813  Mike Modano, 813
  Pierre Turgeon, 812
 Jari Kurri, 797
 Guy Lafleur, 793
 Peter Stastny, 789
 Mats Sundin, 785
 Brian Leetch, 781
 Jean Ratelle, 776
 Vincent Damphousse, 773  Teemu Selanne, 773
  Chris Chelios, 763
 Bernie Federko, 761
 Doug Weight, 755
 Patrick Kane, 750
 Larry Robinson, 750
 Nicklas Backstrom, 747
 Denis Potvin, 742
 Norm Ullman, 739
 Ryan Getzlaf, 737
 Bernie Nicholls, 734

Regular season: Assists per game

Minimum: 300 assists

 Wayne Gretzky, 1.320
 Mario Lemieux, 1.129
 Bobby Orr, 0.982
 Connor McDavid, 0.931
 Peter Forsberg, 0.898
 Peter Stastny, 0.808
 Adam Oates, 0.807
 Paul Coffey, 0.806
 Sidney Crosby, 0.805
 Marcel Dionne, 0.772
 Kent Nilsson, 0.763
 Bernie Federko, 0.761
 Dale Hawerchuk, 0.750
 Bobby Clarke, 0.745
 Craig Janney, 0.741
 Joe Sakic, 0.737
 Mike Bossy, 0.735
 Ray Bourque, 0.725
 Denis Savard, 0.723
 Evgeni Malkin, 0.723
 Ron Francis, 0.722
 Nicklas Backstrom, 0.714
 Artemi Panarin, 0.711
 Bryan Trottier, 0.704
 Guy Lafleur, 0.704

Regular season: Games played (skaters)

 Patrick Marleau, 1,779
 Gordie Howe, 1,767
 Mark Messier, 1,756
 Jaromir Jagr, 1,733
 Ron Francis, 1,731
 Joe Thornton, 1,714
 Zdeno Chara, 1,680
 Mark Recchi, 1,652
 Chris Chelios, 1,651
 Dave Andreychuk, 1,639
 Scott Stevens, 1,635
 Larry Murphy, 1,615
 Ray Bourque, 1,612
 Nicklas Lidstrom, 1,564
 Jarome Iginla, 1,554
 Alex Delvecchio, 1,549
 Johnny Bucyk, 1,540  Shane Doan, 1,540
  Brendan Shanahan, 1,524
 Matt Cullen, 1,516
 Steve Yzerman, 1,514
 Mike Modano, 1,499
 Phil Housley, 1,495
 Wayne Gretzky, 1,487
 Rod Brind'Amour, 1,484

Regular season: Penalty minutes

 Tiger Williams, 3,971
 Dale Hunter, 3,565
 Tie Domi, 3,515
 Marty McSorley, 3,381
 Bob Probert, 3,300
 Robert Ray, 3,207
 Craig Berube, 3,149
 Tim Hunter, 3,146
 Chris Nilan, 3,043
 Rick Tocchet, 2,972
 Pat Verbeek, 2,905
 Chris Chelios, 2,891
 Dave Manson, 2,792
 Scott Stevens, 2,785
 Donald Brashear, 2,634
 Willi Plett, 2,572
 Gino Odjick, 2,567
 Matthew Barnaby, 2,562
 Gary Roberts, 2,560
 Joe Kocur, 2,519
 Kenneth Daneyko, 2,516
 Brendan Shanahan, 2,489
 Scott Mellanby, 2,479
 Chris Neil, 2,459
 Basil McRae, 2,457

Regular season: Plus-minus

 Larry Robinson, +722
 Bobby Orr, +582
 Ray Bourque, +527
 Wayne Gretzky, +520
 Bobby Clarke, +507
 Serge Savard, +462
 Denis Potvin, +456
 Nicklas Lidstrom, +450
 Bryan Trottier, +449
 Guy Lafleur, +446
 Brad McCrimmon, +444
 Mark Howe, +400
 Scott Stevens, +395
 Steve Shutt, +394
 Mike Bossy, +380
 Al MacInnis, +371
 Brad Park, +363
 Chris Chelios, +351
 Jacques Lemaire, +344
 Guy Lapointe, +329  Stan Mikita, +329
Craig Ramsay, +324
 Jaromir Jagr, +322
 Bill Hajt, +321
 Dallas Smith, +318

Regular season: Shots on goal

 Ray Bourque, 6,209
 Alexander Ovechkin, 6,061
 Jaromir Jagr, 5,637
 Marcel Dionne, 5,363
 Phil Esposito, 5,166
 Al MacInnis, 5,157
 Mike Gartner, 5,090
 Wayne Gretzky, 5,088
 Brendan Shanahan, 5,086
 Brett Hull, 4,876
 Jarome Iginla, 4,759
 Joe Sakic, 4,621
 Steve Yzerman, 4,602
 Bobby Hull, 4,577
 Dave Andreychuk, 4,556
 Teemu Selanne, 4,540
 Stan Mikita, 4,482
 Paul Coffey, 4,389
 Patrick Marleau, 4,333
 Mike Modano, 4,273
 Marian Hossa, 4,229
 Mark Messier, 4,221
 Mats Sundin, 4,015
 Sergei Fedorov, 3,985
 Luc Robitaille, 3,961

Regular season: Shooting percentage
Shooting percentage is the percentage of shots on goal which result in a goal.

Minimum 800 shots

 Craig Simpson, 23.66%
 Charlie Simmer, 22.34%
 Paul MacLean, 21.41%
 Mike Bossy, 21.18%
 Yvon Lambert, 19.85%
 Rick Middleton, 19.69%
 Blaine Stoughton, 19.52%
 Darryl Sutter, 19.42%
 Rob Brown, 19.41%
 Mike Ridley, 19.30%
 Steve Vickers, 19.28%
 Kent Nilsson, 19.21%
 Tom McCarthy, 19.16%
 Jari Kurri, 19.13%
 Johnny Bucyk, 19.09%
 Mario Lemieux, 18.99%
 Peter Stastny, 18.96%
 Ray Ferraro, 18.85%
 Mark Hunter, 18.78%
 Tim Kerr, 18.77%

Playoff: Points

 Wayne Gretzky, 382
 Mark Messier, 295
 Jari Kurri, 233
 Glenn Anderson, 214
  Sidney Crosby, 201
 Jaromir Jagr, 201
 Paul Coffey, 196
 Brett Hull, 190
 Doug Gilmour, 188  Joe Sakic, 188
  Steve Yzerman, 185 
 Nicklas Lidstrom, 183
 Bryan Trottier, 182 
 Ray Bourque, 180  Evgeni Malkin, 180
  Jean Beliveau, 176  Sergei Fedorov, 176
 Denis Savard, 175
 Mario Lemieux, 172
 Peter Forsberg, 171
 Denis Potvin, 165
 Mike Bossy, 160  Gordie Howe, 160  Al MacInnis, 160  Bobby Smith, 160

Playoff: Points per game
Minimum: 50 points

 Wayne Gretzky, 1.837
 Mario Lemieux, 1.608
 Nathan MacKinnon, 1.329
 Mark Messier, 1.250
 Bobby Orr, 1.243
 Mike Bossy, 1.240
 Mikko Rantanen, 1.222
 Jari Kurri, 1.165
 Gilbert Perreault, 1.144
 Peter Forsberg, 1.133
 Nikita Kucherov, 1.132
 Peter Stastny, 1.129
 Sidney Crosby, 1.117
 Bernie Federko, 1.110
 Pavel Bure, 1.094
 Joe Sakic, 1.093
 Cale Makar, 1.091
 Jean Beliveau, 1.086
 Bobby Hull, 1.084
 Eric Lindros, 1.076
 Toe Blake, 1.069
 Ken Linseman, 1.062
 David Pastrnak, 1.057
 Phil Esposito, 1.054
 Guy Lafleur, 1.047

Playoff: Goals

 Wayne Gretzky, 122
 Mark Messier, 109
 Jari Kurri, 106
 Brett Hull, 103
 Glenn Anderson, 93
 Mike Bossy, 85
 Joe Sakic, 84
 Maurice Richard, 82
 Claude Lemieux, 80
 Jean Beliveau, 79
 Jaromir Jagr, 78
 Mario Lemieux, 76
 Dino Ciccarelli, 73
 Esa Tikkanen, 72  Patrick Marleau, 72  Alexander Ovechkin, 72
 Bryan Trottier, 71  Sidney Crosby, 71
 Steve Yzerman, 70
 Gordie Howe, 68
 Evgeni Malkin, 67
 Joe Nieuwendyk, 66  Denis Savard, 66
 Yvan Cournoyer, 64  Peter Forsberg, 64  Brian Propp, 64  Bobby Smith, 64   Joe Pavelski, 64

Playoff: Goals per game

Minimum 20 goals

 Mario Lemieux, 0.710
 Mike Bossy, 0.659
 Barry Pederson, 0.647
 Maurice Richard, 0.621
 Cam Neely, 0.613
 Wayne Gretzky, 0.587
 Nathan MacKinnon, 0.560
 Pavel Bure, 0.547
 Craig Simpson, 0.537
 Brayden Point, 0.537
 Jari Kurri, 0.530
 Bobby Hull, 0.521
 Gordie Drillon, 0.520
 Dino Ciccarelli, 0.518
 Brett Hull, 0.510
 Jake Guentzel, 0.510
 Steve Shutt, 0.505
 Alexander Ovechkin, 0.504
 Reggie Leach, 0.500
 Rick Vaive, 0.500
 Tim Kerr, 0.494
 Steve Payne, 0.493
 Joe Sakic, 0.488
 Jean Beliveau, 0.488
 Rick MacLeish, 0.474

Playoff: Power Play goals

 Brett Hull, 38
 Mike Bossy, 35  Wayne Gretzky, 35
 Dino Ciccarelli, 34
 Nicklas Lidstrom, 30
 Mario Lemieux, 29
 Evgeni Malkin, 28  Denis Potvin, 28  Alexander Ovechkin, 28
  Brian Propp, 27  Joe Sakic, 27  Steve Yzerman, 27
  Al MacInnis, 26  Jean Beliveau, 26  [[Joe Pavelski]], 26
  [[Cam Neely]], 25 <br /> [[Daniel Alfredsson]], 25 <br /> [[Jari Kurri]], 25 <br />
 <li value="19"> [[Jaromír Jágr|Jaromir Jagr]], 24 <br /> [[Mike Modano]], 24 <br /> [[Denis Savard]], 24 <br /> [[Bobby Smith (ice hockey)|Bobby Smith]], 24 <br /> [[Patrick Marleau]], 24 <br /> [[Bobby Hull]], 24 <br /> [[Mark Messier]], 24
{{Div col end}}

Playoff: Short-handed goals

{{Div col}}
 [[Mark Messier]], 14
 [[Wayne Gretzky]], 12
 [[Jari Kurri]], 10
 [[Håkan Loob|Hakan Loob]], 8 <br /> [[Ed Westfall]], 8
<li value="6"> [[Mario Lemieux]], 7
 [[Dave Poulin]], 6 <br /> [[Wayne Presley]], 6 <br /> [[Brian Rolston]], 6 <br /> [[Derek Sanderson]], 6 <br /> [[Dave Keon]], 6 <br /> [[Guy Carbonneau]], 6 <br /> [[Paul Coffey]], 6
<li value="14"> [[Bill Barber]], 5 <br /> [[Bob Bourne]], 5 <br /> [[Sergei Fedorov]], 5 <br /> [[Lorne Henning]], 5 <br /> [[Anders Kallur]], 5 <br /> [[Kirk Maltby]], 5 <br /> [[Kelly Miller (ice hockey b. 1963)|Kelly Miller]], 5
{{Div col end}}

Playoff: Game-winning goals
{{Div col}}
 [[Wayne Gretzky]], 24 <br /> [[Brett Hull]], 24
<li value="3"> [[Claude Lemieux]], 19 <br /> [[Joe Sakic]], 19
<li value="5"> [[Maurice Richard]], 18
 [[Glenn Anderson]], 17 <br /> [[Mike Bossy]], 17 <br /> [[Chris Drury]], 17
<li value="9"> [[Jaromír Jágr|Jaromir Jagr]], 16 <br /> [[Patrick Marleau]], 16
<li value="11"> [[Mike Modano]], 15 <br /> [[Yvan Cournoyer]], 15 <br /> [[Jean Béliveau|Jean Beliveau]], 15
<li value="14"> [[Peter Forsberg]], 14 <br /> [[Jari Kurri]], 14 <br /> [[Guy Lafleur]], 14 <br /> [[Joe Nieuwendyk]], 14 <br /> [[Mark Messier]], 14 <br /> [[Bernie Geoffrion]], 14 <br /> '''[[Joe Pavelski]]''', 14
<li value="21"> [[Daniel Brière|Daniel Briere]], 13 <br /> [[Dino Ciccarelli]], 13 <br /> [[Doug Gilmour]], 13 <br /> [[Stéphane Richer (ice hockey forward)|Stephane Richer]], 13 <br /> [[Bobby Smith (ice hockey)|Bobby Smith]], 13 <br /> '''[[Evgeni Malkin]]''', 13
{{Div col end}}

Playoff: Overtime goals
If a game is tied after regulation time (which lasts three 20-minutes periods), there will be as many 20-minute periods of "[[Overtime (ice hockey)|overtime]]" as necessary during the playoffs to determine a winner. The player who scores during this extra time is given the overtime goal. All overtime in the NHL is [[Sudden death (sport)|sudden death]]—meaning the first team to score is the winner—so the player who scores in overtime also has the game-winning goal.
{{Div col}}
 [[Joe Sakic]], 8
 [[Maurice Richard]], 6
 [[Glenn Anderson]], 5 <br/> '''[[Patrick Kane]]''', 5 <br />  '''[[Corey Perry]]''', 5
<li value="6"> [[Martin St. Louis]], 4 <br /> [[Joe Murphy (ice hockey)|Joe Murphy]], 4 <br /> [[Kirk Muller]], 4 <br /> '''[[Nicklas Bäckström|Nicklas Backstrom]]''', 4 <br /> [[Stéphane Richer (ice hockey forward)|Stephane Richer]], 4 <br /> [[Chris Drury]], 4 <br /> [[Jamie Langenbrunner]], 4 <br /> [[Jeremy Roenick]], 4 <br /> [[Bob Nystrom]], 4 <br /> '''[[Patrice Bergeron]]''', 4 <br /> [[Dale Hunter]], 4 <br /> [[Esa Tikkanen]], 4 <br /> [[Patrick Marleau]], 4 <br /> [[Wayne Gretzky]], 4 <br /> [[Jaromír Jágr|Jaromir Jagr]], 4
{{Div col end}}

Playoff: Assists
{{Further|Assist (ice hockey)}}
{{Div col}}
 [[Wayne Gretzky]], 260
 [[Mark Messier]], 186
 [[Ray Bourque]], 139
 [[Paul Coffey]], 137
 '''[[Sidney Crosby]]''', 130
 [[Nicklas Lidström|Nicklas Lidstrom]], 129
 [[Doug Gilmour]], 128
 [[Jari Kurri]], 127
 [[Sergei Fedorov]], 124
 [[Jaromír Jágr|Jaromir Jagr]], 123
 [[Glenn Anderson]], 121 <br /> [[Al MacInnis]], 121
 <li value="13"> [[Larry Robinson]], 116
 [[Larry Murphy (ice hockey)|Larry Murphy]], 115 <br /> [[Steve Yzerman]], 115
 <li value="16"> [[Adam Oates]], 114
 [[Chris Chelios]], 113 <br /> '''[[Evgeni Malkin]]''', 113
 <li value="19"> [[Bryan Trottier]], 111
 [[Denis Savard]], 109 <br /> [[Denis Potvin]], 109
 [[Peter Forsberg]], 107
 [[Joe Sakic]], 104
 '''[[Joe Thornton]]''', 102 <br /> '''[[Nikita Kucherov]]''', 102
{{Div col end}}

Playoff: Assists per game

''Minimum 30 assists''
{{Div col}}
 [[Wayne Gretzky]], 1.250
 [[Mario Lemieux]], 0.897
 [[Bobby Orr]], 0.892
 [[Barry Pederson]], 0.882
 '''[[Nathan MacKinnon]]''', 0.820
 '''[[Mikko Rantanen]]''', 0.791
 [[Mark Messier]], 0.788
 [[Gilbert Perreault]], 0.778
 [[Peter Šťastný|Peter Stastny]], 0.774
 '''[[Nikita Kucherov]]''', 0.735
 [[Brian Leetch]], 0.726
 [[Bernie Federko]], 0.725
 [[Craig Janney]] 0.717
 [[Dale Hawerchuk]], 0.711
 [[Peter Forsberg]], 0.709
 [[Paul Coffey]], 0.706
 [[Doug Gilmour]], 0.703
 '''[[Sidney Crosby]]''', 0.701
 [[Adam Oates]], 0.699
 [[Kent Nilsson]], 0.695
 [[Al MacInnis]], 0.684
 [[Ken Linseman]], 0.681
 [[Sergei Fedorov]], 0.678
 '''[[Erik Karlsson]]''', 0.672
 '''[[Ryan Getzlaf]]''', 0.664
{{Div col end}}

Playoff: Games played (skaters)
{{further|Games played}}
{{Div col}}
 [[Chris Chelios]], 266
 [[Nicklas Lidström|Nicklas Lidstrom]], 263
 [[Mark Messier]], 236
 [[Claude Lemieux]], 234
 [[Scott Stevens]], 233
 [[Guy Carbonneau]], 231
 [[Larry Robinson]], 227
 [[Glenn Anderson]], 225
 [[Kris Draper]], 222
 [[Bryan Trottier]], 221
 [[Mike Keane]], 220
 [[Larry Murphy (ice hockey)|Larry Murphy]], 215
 [[Ray Bourque]], 214 <br /> [[Kevin Lowe]], 214
<li value="15"> [[Wayne Gretzky]], 208 <br /> [[Jaromír Jágr|Jaromir Jagr]], 208
<li value="17"> [[Marián Hossa|Marian Hossa]], 205
 [[Brett Hull]], 202 <br /> [[Scott Niedermayer]], 202
<li value="20"> [[Jari Kurri]], 200 <br /> [[Zdeno Chára|Zdeno Chara]], 200
<li value="22"> [[Steve Yzerman]], 196
 [[Patrick Marleau]], 195
 [[Paul Coffey]], 194
 [[Craig MacTavish]], 193
{{Div col end}}

Playoff: Penalty minutes
A [[Penalty (ice hockey)|penalty]] is given to a player for committing an infraction during the game. The length of the penalty varies depending on the severity of the offence. The amount of penalty minutes recorded for statistical purposes are:
 ''minor'' – 2 minutes
 ''double minor'' – 4 minutes
 ''major'' – 5 minutes
 ''misconduct'' – 10 minutes
 ''game misconduct'' – 10 minutes
{{Div col}}
 [[Dale Hunter]], 731
 [[Chris Nilan]], 541
 [[Claude Lemieux]], 529
 [[Rick Tocchet]], 471
 [[Willi Plett]], 466
 [[Tiger Williams]], 455
 [[Glenn Anderson]], 442
 [[Tim Hunter (ice hockey)|Tim Hunter]], 426
 [[Chris Chelios]], 423
 [[Dave Schultz (ice hockey)|Dave Schultz]], 412
 [[Duane Sutter]], 405
 [[Scott Stevens]], 402
 [[Jim Peplinski]], 382 <br /> [[Al Secord]], 382
 <li value="15"> [[Marty McSorley]], 374
 [[André Dupont|Andre Dupont]], 352
 [[Basil McRae]], 349
 [[Dave Manson]], 343
 [[Terry O'Reilly]], 335
 [[Gary Roberts (ice hockey)|Gary Roberts]], 332
{{Div col end}}

Playoff: Plus-minus
[[Plus-minus (ice hockey)|Plus-minus]] is a statistic that indicates the relative goal differential when a player is on the ice. If the player is on the ice when his team scores [[even-strength]] or [[short-handed]], he is given +1; if he is on the ice when the opposing team scores even-strength or short-handed, he is given -1.
{{Div col}}
 [[Jari Kurri]], +101
 [[Larry Robinson]], +100
 [[Charlie Huddy]], +98
 [[Wayne Gretzky]], +91
 [[Randy Gregg (ice hockey)|Randy Gregg]], +81
 [[Denis Potvin]], +64
 [[Glenn Anderson]], +63
 [[Nicklas Lidström|Nicklas Lidstrom]], +61
 [[Bobby Orr]], +60
 [[Jacques Lemaire]], +54 <br /> [[Peter Forsberg]], +54
<li value="12"> [[Paul Coffey]], +53
 [[Mark Messier]], +52
 [[Guy Lafleur]], +50
 [[Zdeno Chára|Zdeno Chara]], +49 <br /> [[Steve Smith (ice hockey, born in Scotland)|Steve Smith]], +49 <br /> [[Ken Linseman]], +49
<li value="18"> [[Kevin Lowe]], +48 <br /> [[Jimmy Watson (ice hockey)|Jimmy Watson]], +48 <br /> [[Chris Chelios]], +48''' <br /> [[Patrice Bergeron]]''', +48
<li value="22"> [[Serge Savard]], +47
 [[Steve Shutt]], +46
 [[Scott Stevens]], +44
 [[Dallas Smith (ice hockey)|Dallas Smith]], +43 <br /> [[Carol Vadnais]], +43
{{Div col end}}

Playoff: Shots on goal
{{further|Shot on goal (ice hockey)}}
{{Div col}}
 [[Ray Bourque]], 812
 [[Brett Hull]], 803
 [[Claude Lemieux]], 730
 [[Marián Hossa|Marian Hossa]], 712
 [[Wayne Gretzky]], 699
 [[Jaromír Jágr|Jaromir Jagr]], 682
 [[Mark Messier]], 671
 [[Al MacInnis]], 663
 [[Nicklas Lidström|Nicklas Lidstrom]], 656
 '''[[Alexander Ovechkin]]''', 637
 [[Brendan Shanahan]], 622
 [[Paul Coffey]], 616
 '''[[Evgeni Malkin]]''', 608
 [[Sergei Fedorov]], 603
 [[Chris Chelios]], 587
 [[Steve Yzerman]], 584
 [[Joe Sakic]], 582
 [[Denis Potvin]], 578
 [[Glenn Anderson]], 554
 '''[[Patrice Bergeron]]''', 549
 '''[[Sidney Crosby]]''', 542
 [[Phil Esposito]], 535
 [[Bobby Hull]], 531
 [[Jari Kurri]], 527
 [[Jacques Lemaire]], 521
{{Div col end}}

Playoff: Shooting percentage
Shooting percentage is the percentage of [[shot on goal (ice hockey)|shots on goal]] which result in a [[Goal (ice hockey)|goal]].

''Minimum 80 shots''
{{Div col}}
 [[Craig Simpson]], 33.64%
 [[Peter Šťastný|Peter Stastny]], 21.71%
 [[Darryl Sutter]], 21.62%
 [[Andrew Brunette]], 21.25%
 [[Thomas Gradin]], 21.25%
 [[Barry Pederson]], 21.15%
 '''[[Brayden Point]]''', 20.77%
 [[Rick Middleton]], 20.74%
 [[Jari Kurri]], 20.11%
 [[Steve Vickers (ice hockey)|Steve Vickers]], 20.00%
 [[Cam Neely]], 19.79%
 [[Tim Kerr]], 19.70%
 '''[[Jake Guentzel]]''', 19.54%
 [[Mike Bossy]], 19.50%
 [[Paul MacLean (ice hockey)|Paul MacLean]], 19.44%
 [[Ray Ferraro]], 19.27%
 [[Bernie Federko]], 19.13%
 [[Jussi Jokinen]], 19.10%
 [[Tom Fergus]], 19.09%
 [[Mario Lemieux]], 18.91%
 [[Kevin Dineen]], 18.85%
 [[Peter Forsberg]], 18.13%
 [[Steve Shutt]], 18.05%
 [[Orest Kindrachuk]], 18.02% 
 [[Anton Šťastný|Anton Stastny]], 18.02%
{{Div col end}}

Active leaders (skaters)

Regular season: Points (active)
{{Further|Point (ice hockey)}}
{{Div col}}
 [[Joe Thornton]], 1,539
 [[Alexander Ovechkin]], 1,410
 [[Sidney Crosby]], 1,409
 [[Patrick Kane]], 1,180
 [[Evgeni Malkin]], 1,146
 [[Anže Kopitar|Anze Kopitar]], 1,067
 [[Ryan Getzlaf]], 1,019
 [[Nicklas Bäckström|Nicklas Backstrom]], 1,011
 [[Jason Spezza]], 995
 [[Patrice Bergeron]], 982
 [[Steven Stamkos]], 972
 [[Phil Kessel]], 956
 [[Joe Pavelski]], 924
 [[Claude Giroux]], 923
 [[John Tavares]], 895
 [[Blake Wheeler]], 867
 [[Corey Perry]], 858
 [[Jonathan Toews]], 852
 [[Zach Parise]], 845
 [[Jeff Carter]], 807
{{Div col end}}

Regular season: Points per game (active)
''Minimum 500 points''
{{Div col}}
 [[Connor McDavid]], 1.431
 [[Sidney Crosby]], 1.272
 [[Evgeni Malkin]], 1.168
 [[Artemi Panarin]], 1.120
 [[Alexander Ovechkin]], 1.107
 [[Leon Draisaitl]], 1.104
 [[Nikita Kucherov]], 1.096
 [[Patrick Kane]], 1.066
 [[Steven Stamkos]], 1.054
 [[Nathan MacKinnon]], 1.016
 [[Johnny Gaudreau]], 1.012
 [[David Pastrnak]], 0.988
 [[Nicklas Bäckström|Nicklas Backstrom]], 0.956
 [[John Tavares]], 0.943
 [[Aleksander Barkov]], 0.928
 [[Jonathan Huberdeau]], 0.914
 [[Brad Marchand]], 0.910
 [[Claude Giroux]], 0.907
 [[Mark Scheifele]], 0.899
 [[Joe Thornton]], 0.898
 [[Anže Kopitar|Anze Kopitar]], 0.882
 [[Ryan Getzlaf]], 0.881
 [[Vladimir Tarasenko]], 0.865
 [[Taylor Hall]], 0.863
 [[Jonathan Toews]], 0.840
{{Div col end}}

Regular season: Goals (active)
{{Further|Goal (ice hockey)}}
{{Div col}}
 [[Alexander Ovechkin]], 780
 [[Sidney Crosby]], 517
 [[Steven Stamkos]], 481
 [[Evgeni Malkin]], 444
 [[Patrick Kane]], 430
 [[Joe Thornton]], 430
 [[Joe Pavelski]], 421
 [[Jeff Carter]], 418
 [[Zach Parise]], 408
 [[Corey Perry]], 405
 [[Patrice Bergeron]], 400
 [[Phil Kessel]], 399
 [[John Tavares]], 391
 [[Anže Kopitar|Anze Kopitar]], 365
 [[Jason Spezza]], 363
 [[Jonathan Toews]], 357
 [[Brad Marchand]], 351
 [[Jamie Benn]], 329
 [[Dustin Brown (ice hockey)|Dustin Brown]], 325
 [[Max Pacioretty]], 323
{{Div col end}}

Regular season: Goals per game (active)

''Minimum 200 goals''
{{Div col}}
 [[Alexander Ovechkin]], 0.610
 [[Steven Stamkos]], 0.522
 [[Sidney Crosby]], 0.468
 [[David Pastrňák|David Pastrnak]], 0.457
 [[Evgeni Malkin]], 0.451
 [[Nikita Kucherov]], 0.429
 [[John Tavares]], 0.418
 [[Vladimir Tarasenko]], 0.411
 [[Brad Marchand]], 0.397
 [[Patrick Kane]], 0.393
 [[Tyler Seguin]], 0.378
 [[Max Pacioretty]], 0.375
 [[Zach Parise]], 0.371
 [[Nathan MacKinnon]], 0.366
 [[Jonathan Toews]], 0.366
 [[Jeff Carter]], 0.365
 [[Joe Pavelski]], 0.363
 [[Jamie Benn]], 0.359
 [[Logan Couture]], 0.355
 [[Corey Perry]], 0.353
{{Div col end}}

Regular season: Power Play goals (active)
When a team is given a [[Penalty (ice hockey)|penalty]] for committing an infraction (such as [[Tripping (ice hockey)|tripping]] another player), the offending player must sit in the [[penalty box]], and his team must play with one fewer player on the ice. The penalized team is said to be "[[short-handed]]", while the other team has a "[[Power play (sport)|powerplay]]". If a player scores while his team is on the powerplay, this is recorded as a powerplay goal.
{{Div col}}
 [[Alexander Ovechkin]], 285
 [[Steven Stamkos]], 181
 [[Evgeni Malkin]], 162
 [[Sidney Crosby]], 153
 [[Joe Pavelski]], 152
 [[Joe Thornton]], 146
 [[Patrice Bergeron]], 122 <br /> [[Zach Parise]], 122
 <li value="9"> [[Patrick Kane]], 120
 [[Phil Kessel]], 117 <br /> [[Jeff Carter]], 117 <br />
 <li value="12">[[John Tavares]], 116
 [[Corey Perry]], 111
 [[Dustin Brown (ice hockey)|Dustin Brown]], 106 <br /> [[Shea Weber]], 106
 <li value="16"> [[Anže Kopitar|Anze Kopitar]], 104
 [[Wayne Simmonds]], 102
 [[Patric Hornqvist]], 95
 [[Leon Draisaitl]], 93 <br />
{{Div col end}}

Regular season: Short-handed goals (active)
When a team is given a [[Penalty (ice hockey)|penalty]] for committing an infraction (such as [[Tripping (ice hockey)|tripping]] another player), the offending player must sit in the [[penalty box]], and his team must play with one fewer player on the ice. The penalized team is said to be "[[short-handed]]", while the other team has a "[[Power play (sport)|powerplay]]". If a player scores while his team is short handed, this is recorded as a short-handed goal.
{{Div col}}
 [[Brad Marchand]], 33
 [[Andrew Cogliano]], 21
 [[Patrice Bergeron]], 20
 [[Jeff Carter]], 19 <br /> [[Cam Atkinson]], 19 
 <li value="6">[[Jordan Staal]], 17 <br /> [[Cal Clutterbuck]], 17 <br /> [[Jonathan Toews]], 17
 <li value="9"> [[Evander Kane]], 16 <br /> [[Jean-Gabriel Pageau]], 16
 <li value="11"> [[Brad Richardson]], 15 <br /> [[Mikael Backlund]], 15
 <li value="13"> [[Adam Henrique]], 14 <br /> [[Brandon Sutter]], 14 <br /> [[Darren Helm]], 14 <br /> [[Blake Wheeler]], 14 
 <li value="17"> [[Jamie Benn]], 13 <br /> [[Sebastian Aho (ice hockey, born 1997)|Sebastian Aho]], 13 <br /> [[Derek Stepan]], 13 <br /> [[Logan Couture]], 13 <br /> [[Anze Kopitar]], 13
{{Div col end}}

Regular season: Game-winning goals (active)
{{Div col}}
 [[Alexander Ovechkin]], 121
 [[Jeff Carter]], 86
 [[Zach Parise]], 80
 [[Evgeni Malkin]], 78 <br /> [[Sidney Crosby]], 78
 <li value="6"> [[Patrice Bergeron]], 74
 [[Steven Stamkos]], 73
 [[Phil Kessel]], 70
 [[Joe Pavelski]], 69 <br /> [[Corey Perry]], 69
 <li value="11"> [[Jonathan Toews]], 68 <br /> [[Joe Thornton]], 68
 <li value="13"> [[Patrick Kane]], 67 <br /> [[Brad Marchand]], 67
 <li value="15"> [[Max Pacioretty]], 65 
 [[Anze Kopitar]], 61
 [[John Tavares]], 59
 [[Ryan Getzlaf]], 57
 [[Jason Spezza]], 55
 [[Tyler Seguin]], 54
{{Div col end}}

Regular season: Overtime goals (active)
If a game is tied after regulation time (which lasts three 20-minutes periods), there will be a period of "[[Overtime (ice hockey)|overtime]]" to decide the winner. The player who scores during this extra time is given the overtime goal. All overtime in the NHL is [[Sudden death (sport)|sudden death]]—meaning the first team to score is the winner—so the player who scores in overtime also has the game-winning goal.
{{Div col}}
 [[Alexander Ovechkin]], 22
 [[Jeff Carter]], 13 <br /> [[Sidney Crosby]], 13
 <li value="4"> [[Brad Marchand]], 12 <br /> [[Brent Burns]], 12 <br /> [[Evgeni Malkin]], 12
 <li value="7"> [[John Tavares]], 11 
 <li value="8"> [[Sean Monahan]], 10 <br /> [[Max Pacioretty]], 10 <br /> [[Taylor Hall]], 10 <br /> [[Jonathan Toews]], 10 <br /> [[Claude Giroux]], 10 <br /> [[Patrick Marleau]], 10
 <li value="14"> [[Vladimir Tarasenko]], 9 <br /> [[Mike Green (ice hockey, born 1985)|Mike Green]], 9 <br /> [[Loui Eriksson]], 9 <br /> [[Jakub Voráček|Jakub Voracek]], 9 <br /> [[Joe Thornton]], 9 
{{Div col end}}

Regular season: Empty net goals (active)

{{Div col}}
 [[Eric Staal]], 30
 [[Alexander Ovechkin]], 29
 [[Joe Thornton]], 27
 [[Ilya Kovalchuk]], 22
 <li value="6"> [[Patrick Marleau]], 21
 [[Michael Grabner]], 20 <br /> [[Brad Marchand]], 20 <br /> [[John Tavares]], 20 <br /> [[Zach Parise]], 20 <br /> [[Evgeni Malkin]], 20
 <li value="12"> [[Blake Wheeler]], 19
 [[Patrick Kane]], 18 
 <li value="14"> [[Max Pacioretty]], 17 <br /> [[Sidney Crosby]], 17
 <li value="16"> [[Jeff Carter]], 16
 <li value="17"> [[Andrew Cogliano]], 14 <br /> [[Milan Lucic]], 14 <br /> [[Dustin Brown (ice hockey)|Dustin Brown]], 14 <br /> [[Patrice Bergeron]], 14 <br /> [[Corey Perry]], 14
{{Div col end}}

Regular season: Assists (active)
{{Further|Assist (ice hockey)}}
{{Div col}}
 [[Joe Thornton]], 1,109
 [[Sidney Crosby]], 892
 [[Patrick Kane]], 750
 [[Nicklas Bäckström|Nicklas Backstrom]], 747
 [[Ryan Getzlaf]], 737
 [[Anže Kopitar|Anze Kopitar]], 702
 [[Evgeni Malkin]], 702
 [[Jason Spezza]], 632
 [[Alexander Ovechkin]], 630
 [[Claude Giroux]], 629
 [[Patrice Bergeron]], 582
 [[Jakub Voracek]], 578
 [[Blake Wheeler]], 571
 [[Phil Kessel]], 557
 [[Brent Burns]], 550
{{Div col end}}

Regular season: Assists per game (active)

''Minimum 300 assists''
{{Div col}}
 [[Connor McDavid]], 0.940
 [[Sidney Crosby]], 0.816
 [[Nicklas Bäckström|Nicklas Backstrom]], 0.724
 [[Evgeni Malkin]], 0.714
 [[Joe Thornton]], 0.690
 [[Ryan Getzlaf]], 0.685
 [[Patrick Kane]], 0.628
 [[Claude Giroux]], 0.627
 [[Erik Karlsson]], 0.625
 [[Anže Kopitar|Anze Kopitar]], 0.584
 [[Jason Spezza]], 0.570
 [[John Tavares]], 0.522
 [[Jakub Voráček|Jakub Voracek]], 0.518
 [[Paul Stastny]], 0.517
 [[Alexander Ovechkin]], 0.514 
 [[Jamie Benn]], 0.513
 [[Kris Letang]], 0.500
{{Div col end}}

Regular season: Games played (skaters, active)
{{further|Games played}}
{{Div col}}
 [[Joe Thornton]], 1,714
 [[Dustin Brown (ice hockey)|Dustin Brown]], 1,296
 [[Ryan Suter]], 1,280
 [[Alexander Ovechkin]], 1,274
 [[Brent Burns]], 1,251
 [[Patrice Bergeron]], 1,216
 [[Anze Kopitar]], 1,210
{{Div col end}}

Regular season: Penalty minutes (active)
A [[Penalty (ice hockey)|penalty]] is given to a player for committing an infraction during the game. The length of the penalty varies depending on the severity of the offence. The amount of penalty minutes recorded for statistical purposes are:
 ''minor'' – 2 minutes
 ''double minor'' – 4 minutes
 ''major'' – 5 minutes
 ''misconduct'' – 10 minutes
 ''game misconduct'' – 10 minutes
{{Div col}}
 [[Corey Perry]], 1,285
 [[Joe Thornton]], 1,272
 [[Wayne Simmonds]], 1,266
 [[Milan Lucic]], 1,256
 [[Tom Wilson (ice hockey)|Tom Wilson]], 1,221
 [[Antoine Roussel]], 1,063
 [[Matt Martin (ice hockey, born 1989)|Matt Martin]], 1,052
 [[Evander Kane]], 1,048
 [[Evgeni Malkin]], 1,008
{{Div col end}}

Regular season: Plus-minus (active)
[[Plus-minus (ice hockey)|Plus-minus]] is a statistic that indicates the relative goal differential when a player is on the ice. If the player is on the ice when his team scores [[even-strength]] or [[short-handed]], he is given +1; if he is on the ice when the opposing team scores even-strength or they score a goal while he is on the powerplay, he is given -1.
{{Div col}}
 [[Brad Marchand]], +263
 [[Patrice Bergeron]], +254
 [[Ryan McDonagh]], +215
 [[Sidney Crosby]], +202
 [[Joe Thornton]], +182
 [[Jonathan Toews]], +179
 [[Duncan Keith]], +159
 [[Ondrej Palat]], +147 <br /> [[Victor Hedman]], +147 <br /> [[Joe Pavelski]], +147
  <li value="11"> [[Artemi Panarin]], +134
 [[Ian Cole]], +131
 [[Nikita Kucherov]], +129
{{Div col end}}

Regular season: Shots on goal (active)
{{further|Shot on goal (ice hockey)}}
{{Div col}}
 [[Alexander Ovechkin]], 6,061
 [[Jeff Carter]], 3,738
 [[Patrice Bergeron]], 3,725
 [[Phil Kessel]], 3,700
 [[Patrick Kane]], 3,684
 [[Zach Parise]], 3,544
 [[Sidney Crosby]], 3,539
 [[Brent Burns]], 3,437
 [[Dustin Brown (ice hockey)|Dustin Brown]], 3,360
 [[Joe Pavelski]], 3,328
 [[Evgeni Malkin]], 3,246
 [[Corey Perry]], 3,162
 [[Joe Thornton]], 3,068
 [[John Tavares]], 2,993
{{Div col end}}

Regular season: Shooting percentage (active)
Shooting percentage is the percentage of [[shot on goal (ice hockey)|shots on goal]] which result in a [[Goal (ice hockey)|goal]].

''Minimum 800 shots''
{{Div col}}
 [[Leon Draisaitl]], 17.6%
 [[Brayden Point]], 17.1%
 [[Steven Stamkos]], 17.0%
 [[Auston Matthews]], 16.4%
 [[Mark Scheifele]], 16.3%
 [[Jake Guentzel]], 15.9%
 [[Brad Marchand]], 15.8%
 [[Mikko Rantanen]], 15.7%
 [[Mark Stone (ice hockey)|Mark Stone]], 15.6%
 [[Alex DeBrincat]], 15.5%
 [[Kyle Connor]], 15.3%
 [[Adam Henrique]], 15.2%
 [[Patrik Laine]], 15.1%
 [[Nikita Kucherov]], 15.0%
 [[Connor McDavid]], 15.0%
{{Div col end}}

Playoff: Points (active)
{{Further|Point (ice hockey)}}
{{Div col}}
 [[Sidney Crosby]], 201
 [[Evgeni Malkin]], 180
 [[Nikita Kucherov]], 154
 [[Alexander Ovechkin]], 141
 [[Joe Thornton]], 134
 [[Patrick Kane]], 132
 [[Patrice Bergeron]], 127
 [[Joe Pavelski]], 125
 [[Ryan Getzlaf]], 120
 [[Jonathan Toews]], 119 <br /> [[Corey Perry]], 119
 <li value="12"> [[Brad Marchand]], 118
 [[Nicklas Bäckström|Nicklas Backstrom]], 114
 [[Victor Hedman]], 107
 [[Logan Couture]], 101
 [[Ondrej Palat]], 94
 [[Nathan MacKinnon]], 93
 [[Steven Stamkos]], 91 <br /> [[Duncan Keith]], 91
 <li value="20">[[Kris Letang]], 90
{{Div col end}}

Playoff: Points per game (active)
''Minimum 50 points''

{{Div col}}
 [[Leon Draisaitl]], 1.59
 [[Connor McDavid]], 1.49
 [[Nathan MacKinnon]], 1.33
 [[Mikko Rantanen]], 1.22
 [[Nikita Kucherov]], 1.13
 [[Sidney Crosby]], 1.12
 [[Cale Makar]], 1.09
 [[David Pastrnak]], 1.06
 [[Brayden Point]], 1.03
 [[Evgeni Malkin]], 1.02
 [[Jake Guentzel]], 1.00
 [[Gabriel Landeskog]], 0.97
 [[Patrick Kane]], 0.97
 [[Ryan Getzlaf]], 0.96
 [[Alexander Ovechkin]], 0.96
 [[Ryan O'Reilly]], 0.88
 [[Logan Couture]], 0.87
 [[Jonathan Toews]], 0.87
 [[Claude Giroux]], 0.85
 [[Brad Marchand]], 0.85
{{Div col end}}

Playoff: Goals (active)
{{Further|Goal (ice hockey)}}
{{Div col}}
 [[Alexander Ovechkin]], 72
 [[Sidney Crosby]], 71
 [[Evgeni Malkin]], 67
 [[Joe Pavelski]], 64
 [[Patrick Kane]], 52
 [[Nikita Kucherov]], 52
 [[Corey Perry]], 51
 [[Brad Marchand]], 49
 [[Patrice Bergeron]], 49
 [[Ondrej Palat]], 48
 [[Logan Couture]], 48
 [[Jeff Carter]], 47
 [[Jonathan Toews]], 45
 [[Steven Stamkos]], 43
 [[Nathan MacKinnon]], 41
 [[Vladimir Tarasenko]], 41
 [[Brayden Point]], 38
 [[Nicklas Bäckström|Nicklas Backstrom]], 38
 [[Ryan Getzlaf]], 37
 [[Zach Parise]], 37
{{Div col end}}

Playoff: Goals per game (active)

''Minimum 20 goals''
{{Div col}}
 [[Jake Guentzel]], 0.622
 [[Alexander Ovechkin]], 0.504
 [[Vladimir Tarasenko]], 0.500
 [[Nikita Kucherov]], 0.468
 [[Sidney Crosby]], 0.413
 [[Filip Forsberg]], 0.400
 [[Patrick Kane]], 0.394
 [[Evgeni Malkin]], 0.392
 [[Patrick Marleau]], 0.391
 [[Phil Kessel]], 0.386
 [[Tyler Johnson (ice hockey)|Tyler Johnson]], 0.375
 [[Evgeny Kuznetsov]], 0.365
 [[Joe Pavelski]], 0.364
 [[Zach Parise]], 0.361
 [[Logan Couture]], 0.354
 [[Claude Giroux]], 0.348
 [[Eric Staal]], 0.345
 [[Steven Stamkos]], 0.333
{{Div col end}}

Playoff: Power Play goals (active)
When a team is given a [[Penalty (ice hockey)|penalty]] for committing an infraction (such as [[Tripping (ice hockey)|tripping]] another player), the offending player must sit in the [[penalty box]], and his team must play with one fewer player on the ice. The penalized team is said to be "[[short-handed]]," while the other team has a "[[Power play (sport)|powerplay]]." If a player scores while his team is on the powerplay, this is recorded as a powerplay goal.
{{Div col}}
 [[Evgeni Malkin]], 28
 [[Alexander Ovechkin]], 28
 [[Joe Pavelski]], 26
 [[Sidney Crosby]], 20
 [[Jonathan Toews]], 19
 [[Nikita Kucherov]], 18
 [[T. J. Oshie]], 18
 [[Jeff Carter]], 18
 [[Steven Stamkos]], 17
 [[Corey Perry]], 17
 [[Logan Couture]], 16
 [[Patrice Bergeron]], 16
 [[Ryan Getzlaf]], 15
 [[Brayden Point]], 14
 [[Nathan MacKinnon]], 13
 [[Zach Parise]], 13
 [[Vladimir Tarasenko]], 13
 [[Brad Marchand]], 13
{{Div col end}}

Playoff: Short-handed goals (active)
When a team is given a [[Penalty (ice hockey)|penalty]] for committing an infraction (such as [[Tripping (ice hockey)|tripping]] another player), the offending player must sit in the [[penalty box]], and his team must play with one fewer player on the ice. The penalized team is said to be "[[short-handed]]", while the other team has a "[[Power play (sport)|powerplay]]". If a player scores while his team is short handed, this is recorded as a short-handed goal.
{{Div col}}
 [[Jonathan Toews]], 3 <br /> [[Patrice Bergeron]], 3
 <li value="3"> [[Claude Giroux]], 2 <br /> [[Ryan Getzlaf]], 2 <br /> [[Carl Hagelin]], 2 <br /> [[Anže Kopitar|Anze Kopitar]], 2 <br /> [[Zach Parise]], 2 <br /> [[Jamie Benn]], 2 
{{Div col end}}

Playoff: Game-winning goals (active)
{{Div col}}
 [[Joe Pavelski]], 14
 [[Evgeni Malkin]], 13
 [[Ondrej Palat]], 12
 [[Patrick Kane]], 11
 [[Jonathan Toews]], 11
 [[Brad Marchand]], 10
 [[Patrice Bergeron]], 10
 [[Corey Perry]], 10
 [[Alexander Ovechkin]], 10
 [[Sidney Crosby]], 9
 [[Tyler Johnson (ice hockey)|Tyler Johnson]], 9
 [[Paul Stastny]], 9
 [[Chris Kreider]], 9
 [[Joe Thornton]], 8
 [[Jake Guentzel]], 8
 [[Logan Couture]], 8
 [[Nikita Kucherov]], 8
{{Div col end}}

Playoff: Overtime goals (active)
If a game is tied after regulation time (which lasts three 20-minutes periods), there will be a period of "[[Overtime (ice hockey)|overtime]]" to decide the winner. The player who scores during this extra time is given the overtime goal. All overtime in the NHL is [[Sudden death (sport)|sudden death]]—meaning the first team to score is the winner—so the player who scores in overtime also has the game-winning goal.
{{Div col}}
 [[Patrick Kane]], 5 <br /> [[Corey Perry]], 4
 <li value="3"> [[Patrice Bergeron]], 4  <br /> [[Nicklas Bäckström|Nicklas Backstrom]], 4
 <li value="5"> [[Brayden Point]], 3 <br /> [[Jordan Staal]], 3 <br /> [[Brad Marchand]], 3 <br /> [[Joe Pavelski]], 3
{{Div col end}}

Playoff: Assists (active)
{{Further|Assist (ice hockey)}}
{{Div col}}
 [[Sidney Crosby]], 130
 [[Evgeni Malkin]], 113
 [[Joe Thornton]], 102
 [[Nikita Kucherov]], 102
 [[Victor Hedman]], 85
 [[Ryan Getzlaf]], 83
 [[Patrick Kane]], 80
 [[Patrice Bergeron]], 78
 [[Nicklas Bäckström|Nicklas Backstrom]], 76
 [[Jonathan Toews]], 74
 [[Duncan Keith]], 72
 [[Brad Marchand]], 69
 [[Alexander Ovechkin]], 69
 [[Corey Perry]], 68
 [[Kris Letang]], 67
 [[Joe Pavelski]], 61
 [[Mikko Rantanen]], 54
 [[John Carlson (ice hockey)|John Carlson]], 54
 [[Logan Couture]], 53
 [[Claude Giroux]], 53
{{Div col end}}

Playoff: Assists per game (active)

''Minimum 30 assists''
{{Div col}}
 [[Sidney Crosby]], 0.744
 [[Ryan Getzlaf]], 0.664
 [[Evgeni Malkin]], 0.652
 [[Erik Karlsson]], 0.646
 [[Jason Spezza]], 0.623
 [[Joe Thornton]], 0.600
 [[Claude Giroux]], 0.594
 [[Nicklas Bäckström|Nicklas Backstrom]], 0.578
 [[Patrick Kane]], 0.575
 [[Anže Kopitar|Anze Kopitar]], 0.570
 [[Jonathan Toews]], 0.547
 [[Phil Kessel]], 0.518
 [[Duncan Keith]], 0.500 <br /> [[Victor Hedman]], 0.500
 <li value="15"> [[Patrice Bergeron]], 0.491
 [[Logan Couture]], 0.490
 [[Nikita Kucherov]], 0.484
 [[P. K. Subban]], 0.467
 [[Brad Marchand]], 0.464
{{Div col end}}

Playoff: Games played (skaters, active)
{{further|Games played}}
{{Div col}}
 [[Corey Perry]], 190
 [[Joe Thornton]], 187
 [[Ryan McDonagh]], 185
 [[Sidney Crosby]], 180
 [[Evgeni Malkin]], 177
 [[Joe Pavelski]], 168
 [[Patrice Bergeron]], 167
 [[Victor Hedman]], 155
 [[Duncan Keith]], 151
 [[Kris Letang]], 149
 [[Alexander Ovechkin]], 147
 [[Pat Maroon]], 144
 [[Alexander Ovechkin]], 141
 [[Nicklas Backstrom]], 139
 [[Brad Marchand]], 139
 [[Ondrej Palat]], 138
 [[Jonathan Toews]], 137
 [[Nikita Kucherov]], 136
 [[Patrick Kane]], 136
 [[Milan Lucic]], 136
{{Div col end}}

Playoff: Penalty minutes (active)
A [[Penalty (ice hockey)|penalty]] is given to a player for committing an infraction during the game. The length of the penalty varies depending on the severity of the offence. The amount of penalty minutes recorded for statistical purposes are:
 ''minor'' – 2 minutes
 ''double minor'' – 4 minutes
 ''major'' – 5 minutes
 ''misconduct'' – 10 minutes
 ''game misconduct'' – 10 minutes
{{Div col}}
 [[Corey Perry]], 264
 [[Evgeni Malkin]], 242
 [[Milan Lucic]], 229
 [[Pat Maroon]], 218
 [[Kris Letang]], 142
 [[Brad Marchand]], 141
 [[Ryan Getzlaf]], 137
 [[Joe Thornton]], 134
 [[P. K. Subban]], 133 <br /> [[Ryan Kesler]], 133
{{Div col end}}

Playoff: Plus-minus (active)
[[Plus-minus (ice hockey)|Plus-minus]] is a statistic that indicates the relative goal differential when a player is on the ice. If the player is on the ice when his team scores [[even-strength]] or [[short-handed]], he is given +1; if he is on the ice when the opposing team scores even-strength or short-handed, he is given -1.
{{Div col}}
 [[Patrice Bergeron]], +48
 [[Nikita Kucherov]], +38
 [[Ondrej Palat]], +35
 [[Brad Marchand]], +33
 [[Milan Lucic]], +32
 [[Reilly Smith]], +27
 [[Nathan MacKinnon]], +26
 [[Cale Makar]], +22
 [[Victor Hedman]], +21
 [[Phil Kessel]], +21 
 [[Duncan Keith]], +20
 [[Anže Kopitar|Anze Kopitar]], +18
 [[Sidney Crosby]], +18
{{Div col end}}

Playoff: Shots on goal (active)
{{further|Shot on goal (ice hockey)}}
{{Div col}}
 [[Alexander Ovechkin]], 637
 [[Evgeni Malkin]], 608
 [[Patrice Bergeron]], 549 
 [[Sidney Crosby]], 542
 [[Joe Pavelski]], 493
 [[Corey Perry]], 468
 [[Jeff Carter]], 428
 [[Patrick Kane]], 422
 [[Nikita Kucherov]], 412
 [[Victor Hedman]], 392
 [[James Neal (ice hockey)|James Neal]], 372
 [[Kris Letang]], 367
 [[Brad Marchand]], 364
 [[Joe Thornton]], 360
 [[Jonathan Toews]], 350
 [[John Carlson (ice hockey)|John Carlson]], 347
 [[Zach Parise]], 343
 [[Ryan Getzlaf]], 328
 [[Logan Couture]], 326
{{Div col end}}

Playoff: Shooting percentage (active)
Shooting percentage is the percentage of [[shot on goal (ice hockey)|shots on goal]] which result in a [[Goal (ice hockey)|goal]].

''Minimum 80 shots''
{{Div col}}
 [[Brayden Point]], 20.8%
 [[Jake Guentzel]], 19.5%
 [[Joonas Donskoi]], 17.7%
 [[Leon Draisaitl]], 17.5%
 [[Connor McDavid]], 16.9%
 [[Chris Kreider]], 16.8%
 [[Ondřej Palát|Ondrej Palat]], 16.6%
 [[Andre Burakovsky]], 16.1%
 [[Mark Stone (ice hockey)|Mark Stone]], 16.1%
 [[Ryan Johansen]], 15.8%
 [[Ryan O'Reilly]], 15.6%
 [[T.J. Oshie]], 15.5%
 [[Brock Nelson]], 15.3%
 [[Steven Stamkos]], 15.0%
 [[Bryan Rust]], 14.8%
{{Div col end}}

Goaltenders
The statistics listed include the [[2021–22 NHL season|2021–22 NHL regular season]] and [[2022 Stanley Cup playoffs|2022 playoffs]].

All-time leaders (goaltenders)
Active goaltenders (during 2021–22 NHL season) are listed in '''boldface'''.

Regular season: Games played
{{Div col}}
 [[Martin Brodeur]], 1266
 [[Roberto Luongo]], 1044
 [[Patrick Roy]], 1029
 [[Terry Sawchuk]], 971
 [[Ed Belfour]], 963
 [[Curtis Joseph]], 943
 '''[[Marc-André Fleury|Marc-Andre Fleury]]''', 939
 [[Glenn Hall]], 906
 [[Henrik Lundqvist]], 887
 [[Tony Esposito]], 886
 [[John Vanbiesbrouck]], 882
 [[Grant Fuhr]], 868
 [[Gump Worsley]], 860
 [[Jacques Plante]], 837
 [[Sean Burke]], 820
 [[Harry Lumley (ice hockey)|Harry Lumley]], 803
 [[Nikolai Khabibulin]], 799
 [[Ryan Miller]], 796
 [[Rogie Vachon]], 795
 [[Gilles Meloche]], 788
 [[Mike Vernon (ice hockey)|Mike Vernon]], 782
 [[Tom Barrasso]], 777
 [[Chris Osgood]], 744
 [[Dominik Hašek|Dominik Hasek]], 735
 [[Olaf Kölzig|Olaf Kolzig]], 719
{{Div col end}}

Regular season: Wins
{{Div col}}
 [[Martin Brodeur]], 691
 [[Patrick Roy]], 551
 '''[[Marc-André Fleury|Marc-Andre Fleury]]''', 520
 [[Roberto Luongo]], 489
 [[Ed Belfour]], 484
 [[Henrik Lundqvist]], 459
 [[Curtis Joseph]], 454
 [[Terry Sawchuk]], 445
 [[Jacques Plante]], 437
 [[Tony Esposito]], 423
 [[Glenn Hall]], 407
 [[Grant Fuhr]], 403
 [[Chris Osgood]], 401
 [[Ryan Miller]], 391
 [[Dominik Hašek|Dominik Hasek]], 389
 [[Mike Vernon (ice hockey)|Mike Vernon]], 385
 [[John Vanbiesbrouck]], 374
 [[Andy Moog]], 372
 [[Tom Barrasso]], 369 <br /> [[Pekka Rinne]], 369
 <li value="21"> '''[[Carey Price]]''', 361
 '''[[Jonathan Quick]]''', 359
 [[Evgeni Nabokov]], 353 <br /> [[Rogie Vachon]], 353
 '''[[Sergei Bobrovsky]]''', 336
{{Div col end}}

Regular season: Shutouts
A goaltender achieves a [[shutout]] when he does not allow a goal against him, and plays the full game.
{{Div col}}
 [[Martin Brodeur]], 125
 [[Terry Sawchuk]], 103
 [[George Hainsworth]], 94
 [[Glenn Hall]], 84
 [[Jacques Plante]], 82
 [[Dominik Hašek|Dominik Hasek]], 81 <br /> [[Alex Connell]], 81 <br /> [[Tiny Thompson]], 81
 <li value="9"> [[Roberto Luongo]], 77
 [[Ed Belfour]], 76 <br /> [[Tony Esposito]]
 <li value="12"> [[Harry Lumley (ice hockey)|Harry Lumley]], 71 <br /> [[Lorne Chabot]], 71 <br /> '''[[Marc-André Fleury|Marc-Andre Fleury]]''', 71
 <li value="15"> [[Roy Worters]], 67 
 [[Patrick Roy]], 66
 [[Henrik Lundqvist]], 64
 [[Turk Broda]], 61
 [[Pekka Rinne]], 60
 [[Evgeni Nabokov]], 59
 [[John Ross Roach]], 58
 [[Clint Benedict]], 57
 '''[[Jonathan Quick]]''', 56
 <li value="24"> [[Eddie Giacomin]], 54 <br /> [[Bernie Parent]], 54
{{Div col end}}

Regular season: Goals against average
[[Goals against average]] is the average number of goals a goaltender allows over a 60-minute period (the regulation length of a game). It is calculated by multiplying the ''goals against'' by 60 minutes, then dividing by the total minutes played.

''Minimum 250 games played''
{{Div col}}
 [[Alec Connell]], 1.92
 [[George Hainsworth]], 1.93
 [[Lorne Chabot]], 2.02
 [[Charlie Gardiner (ice hockey)|Chuck Gardiner]], 2.02
 [[Tiny Thompson]], 2.07
 [[Dave Kerr]], 2.14
 [[Dominik Hašek|Dominik Hasek]], 2.20
 [[Ken Dryden]], 2.24
 [[Martin Brodeur]], 2.24
 [[Tuukka Rask]], 2.27
 [[Roy Worters]], 2.28
 [[Roman Turek]], 2.31
 [[Clint Benedict]], 2.32
 [[Ben Bishop]], 2.32
 [[Gerry McNeil]], 2.34
 [[Bill Durnan]], 2.36
 [[Marty Turco]], 2.36
 [[Jacques Plante]], 2.38
 [[Manny Legace]], 2.41
 '''[[Jonathan Quick]]''', 2.42
 [[Pekka Rinne]], 2.43
 [[Henrik Lundqvist]], 2.43
 '''[[Cory Schneider]]''', 2.43
 [[Evgeni Nabokov]], 2.44
 [[Corey Crawford]], 2.45
{{Div col end}}

Regular season: Saves
{{Div col}}
 [[Martin Brodeur]], 28,928
 [[Roberto Luongo]], 28,409
 [[Patrick Roy]], 25,800
 [[Tony Esposito]], 24,761
 [[Glenn Hall]], 24,611
 '''[[Marc-André Fleury|Marc-Andre Fleury]]''', 24,400
 [[Curtis Joseph]], 24,279
 [[Henrik Lundqvist]], 23,509
 [[Ed Belfour]], 22,433
 [[John Vanbiesbrouck]], 22,203
 [[Gump Worsley]], 21,766
 [[Ryan Miller]], 21,665
 [[Grant Fuhr]], 21,615
 [[Gilles Meloche]], 21,138
 [[Sean Burke]], 21,003
 [[Jacques Plante]], 20,889
 [[Nikolai Khabibulin]], 20,258
 [[Rogie Vachon]], 19,882
 [[Tom Barrasso]], 19,694
 '''[[Carey Price]]''', 19,304
 '''[[Craig Anderson (ice hockey)|Craig Anderson]]''', 19,099
 [[Dominik Hašek|Dominik Hasek]], 18,648
 [[Tomáš Vokoun|Tomas Vokoun]], 18,625
 [[Cam Ward]], 18,259
 [[Olaf Kölzig|Olaf Kolzig]], 18,233
{{Div col end}}

Regular season: Save percentage
[[Save percentage]] is the percentage of [[shot on goal (ice hockey)|shots on goal]] that a goaltender stops. It is calculated by dividing the number of saves by the number of shots on goal.

''Minimum 250 games played''
{{Div col}}
 [[Dominik Hašek|Dominik Hasek]], .922
 [[Ken Dryden]], .922
 [[Tuukka Rask]], .921
 [[Ben Bishop]], .921
 [[Tim Thomas (ice hockey, born 1974)|Tim Thomas]], .920
 '''[[Andrei Vasilevskiy]]''', .919
 [[Roberto Luongo]], .919
 [[Henrik Lundqvist]], .918
 '''[[Cory Schneider]]''', .918
 '''[[Darcy Kuemper]]''', .918
 [[Corey Crawford]], .918
 [[Tomáš Vokoun|Tomas Vokoun]], .917
 [[Pekka Rinne]], .917
 '''[[Carey Price]]''', .917
 '''[[Robin Lehner]]''', .917
 '''[[Anton Khudobin]]''', .916
 '''[[Frederik Andersen]]''', .916
 '''[[Sergei Bobrovsky]]''', .916
 '''[[Semyon Varlamov]]''', .916
 '''[[Jaroslav Halák|Jaroslav Halak]]''', .916
 '''[[Connor Hellebuyck]]''', .916
 [[Bernie Parent]], .915
 '''[[Cam Talbot]]''', .915
 '''[[Braden Holtby]]''', .915
 '''[[John Gibson (ice hockey, born 1993)|John Gibson]]''', .915
{{Div col end}}

Regular season: Minutes
{{Div col}}
 [[Martin Brodeur]], 74,439
 [[Patrick Roy]], 60,215
 [[Roberto Luongo]], 59,879
 [[Terry Sawchuk]], 57,156
 [[Ed Belfour]], 55,696
 '''[[Marc-André Fleury|Marc-Andre Fleury]]''', 54,392
 [[Curtis Joseph]], 54,055
 [[Glenn Hall]], 53,447
 [[Tony Esposito]], 52,476
 [[Henrik Lundqvist]], 51,817
 [[John Vanbiesbrouck]], 50,455
 [[Gump Worsley]], 50,156
 [[Jacques Plante]], 49,514
 [[Grant Fuhr]], 48,928
 [[Harry Lumley (ice hockey)|Harry Lumley]], 48,039
 [[Sean Burke]], 46,441
 [[Rogie Vachon]], 46,207
 [[Ryan Miller]], 46,146
 [[Nikolai Khabibulin]], 45,607
 [[Gilles Meloche]], 45,323
 [[Mike Vernon (ice hockey)|Mike Vernon]], 44,503
 [[Tom Barrasso]], 44,136
 [[Dominik Hašek|Dominik Hasek]], 42,837
 [[Chris Osgood]], 42,563
 '''[[Carey Price]]''', 42,006
{{Div col end}}

Playoff: Games played
{{Div col}}
 [[Patrick Roy]], 247
 [[Martin Brodeur]], 205
 '''[[Marc-André Fleury|Marc-Andre Fleury]]''', 167
 [[Ed Belfour]], 161
 [[Grant Fuhr]], 150
 [[Mike Vernon (ice hockey)|Mike Vernon]], 138
 [[Curtis Joseph]], 133
 [[Andy Moog]], 132 <br /> [[Billy Smith (ice hockey)|Billy Smith]], 132
 <li value="10"> [[Henrik Lundqvist]], 130
 [[Chris Osgood]], 129
 [[Tom Barrasso]], 119 <br /> [[Dominik Hašek|Dominik Hasek]], 119
 <li value="14"> [[Glenn Hall]], 115
 [[Jacques Plante]], 112 <br /> [[Ken Dryden]], 112
 <li value="17"> [[Terry Sawchuk]], 106
 [[Pekka Rinne]], 104
 '''[[Andrei Vasilevskiy]]''', 104
 [[Turk Broda]], 101
 [[Tony Esposito]], 99
 '''[[Braden Holtby]]''', 97
 [[Corey Crawford]], 96
 [[Ron Hextall]], 93
 '''[[Carey Price]]''', 92
 '''[[Jonathan Quick]]''', 92
{{Div col end}}

Playoff: Wins
{{Div col}}
 [[Patrick Roy]], 151
 [[Martin Brodeur]], 113
 '''[[Marc-André Fleury|Marc-Andre Fleury]]''', 92
 [[Grant Fuhr]], 92
 [[Ed Belfour]], 88 <br /> [[Billy Smith (ice hockey)|Billy Smith]], 88
 <li value="7"> [[Ken Dryden]], 80
 [[Mike Vernon (ice hockey)|Mike Vernon]], 77
 [[Chris Osgood]], 74
 [[Jacques Plante]], 71
 [[Andy Moog]], 68
 [[Dominik Hašek|Dominik Hasek]], 65
 '''[[Andrei Vasilevskiy]]''', 63 <br /> [[Curtis Joseph]], 63
 <li value="15"> [[Tom Barrasso]], 61 <br /> [[Henrik Lundqvist]], 61
 <li value="17"> [[Turk Broda]], 60
 [[Tuukka Rask]], 57
 [[Terry Sawchuk]], 54
 [[Gerry Cheevers]], 53
 [[Corey Crawford]], 52
 '''[[Braden Holtby]]''', 50
 [[Glenn Hall]], 49 <br /> '''[[Jonathan Quick]]''', 49
 <li value="25"> [[Ron Hextall]], 47
{{Div col end}}

Playoff: Shutouts
A goaltender achieves a [[shutout]] when he does not allow a goal against him, and plays the full game.
{{Div col}}
 [[Martin Brodeur]], 24
 [[Patrick Roy]], 23
 [[Curtis Joseph]], 16 <br /> '''[[Marc-André Fleury|Marc-Andre Fleury]]''', 16
 <li value="5"> [[Chris Osgood]], 15
 [[Ed Belfour]], 14 <br /> [[Dominik Hašek|Dominik Hasek]], 14 <br /> [[Jacques Plante]], 14
 <li value="9"> [[Turk Broda]], 13
 [[Terry Sawchuk]], 12
 [[Ken Dryden]], 10 <br /> [[Henrik Lundqvist]], 10
 <li value="13">  '''[[Jonathan Quick]]''', 9 <br /> [[Mike Richter]], 9 <br /> [[Clint Benedict]], 9
 <li value="16"> [[Gerry Cheevers]], 8 <br /> [[George Hainsworth]], 8 <br /> [[Dave Kerr]], 8 <br /> [[Félix Potvin|Felix Potvin]], 8 <br /> '''[[Carey Price]]''', 8
 <li value="21"> [[Harry Lumley (ice hockey)|Harry Lumley]], 7 <br /> [[Evgeni Nabokov]], 7  <br /> [[Tiny Thompson]], 7 <br /> [[John Ross Roach]], 7 <br /> '''[[Braden Holtby]]''', 7 <br /> [[Tuukka Rask]], 7 <br /> '''[[Andrei Vasilevskiy]]''', 7
{{Div col end}}

Playoff: Goals against average
[[Goals against average]] is the average number of goals a goaltender allows over a 60-minute period (the regulation length of a game). It is calculated by multiplying the ''goals against'' by 60 minutes, then dividing by the total minutes played.

''Minimum 25 games played''
{{Div col}}
 [[Lorne Chabot]], 1.53
 [[Dave Kerr]], 1.74
 [[Patrick Lalime]], 1.77
 [[Gerry McNeil]], 1.84
 [[Clint Benedict]], 1.86
 [[Tiny Thompson]], 1.88
 [[John Ross Roach]], 1.89
 [[George Hainsworth]], 1.93
 [[Turk Broda]], 1.98
 [[Dominik Hašek|Dominik Hasek]], 2.02
 [[Martin Brodeur]], 2.02
 '''[[Jake Allen (ice hockey)|Jake Allen]]''', 2.06
 [[Bill Durnan]], 2.07
 [[Tim Thomas (ice hockey, born 1974)|Tim Thomas]], 2.08
 [[Jean-Sébastien Giguère|Jean-Sebastien Giguere]], 2.08
 [[Chris Osgood]], 2.09
 [[Jacques Plante]], 2.12
 '''[[Braden Holtby]]''', 2.13
 [[Olaf Kölzig|Olaf Kolzig]], 2.14
 [[Marty Turco]], 2.17
 [[Ed Belfour]], 2.17
 '''[[Matt Murray (ice hockey, born 1994)|Matt Murray]]''', 2.18
 '''[[Robin Lehner]]''', 2.19
 [[Tuukka Rask]], 2.22
 [[Ron Tugnutt]], 2.27
 [[Ben Bishop]], 2.27
{{Div col end}}

Playoff: Saves
{{Div col}}
 [[Patrick Roy]], 6,559
 [[Martin Brodeur]], 4,830
 '''[[Marc-André Fleury|Marc-Andre Fleury]]''', 4,410
 [[Ed Belfour]], 4,117
 [[Grant Fuhr]], 3,777
 [[Curtis Joseph]], 3,599
 [[Henrik Lundqvist]], 3,567
 [[Billy Smith (ice hockey)|Billy Smith]], 3,306
 [[Glenn Hall]], 3,285
 [[Tom Barrasso]], 3,218
 [[Mike Vernon (ice hockey)|Mike Vernon]], 3,154
 [[Andy Moog]], 3,046
 [[Dominik Hašek|Dominik Hasek]], 3,037
 [[Tuukka Rask]], 2,992
 [[Ken Dryden]], 2,953
 [[Chris Osgood]], 2,918
 '''[[Andrei Vasilevskiy]]''', 2,902
 [[Tony Esposito]], 2,867
 [[Jacques Plante]], 2,790
 [[Corey Crawford]], 2,676
 '''[[Braden Holtby]]''', 2,675
 '''[[Jonathan Quick]]''', 2,514
 '''[[Carey Price]]''', 2,489
 [[Ron Hextall]], 2,392
 [[Pekka Rinne]], 2,351
{{Div col end}}

Playoff: Save percentage
[[Save percentage]] is the percentage of [[shot on goal (ice hockey)|shots on goal]] that a goaltender stops. It is calculated by dividing the number of saves by the number of shots on goal.

''Minimum 25 games played''
{{Div col}}
 [[Tim Thomas (ice hockey, born 1974)|Tim Thomas]], .933
 [[Jonas Hiller]], .930
 '''[[Craig Anderson (ice hockey)|Craig Anderson]]''', .929
 [[Olaf Kölzig|Olaf Kolzig]], .927
 [[Patrick Lalime]], .926
 '''[[Braden Holtby]]''', .926
 [[Jean-Sébastien Giguère|Jean-Sebastien Giguere]], .925
 [[Tuukka Rask]], .925
 [[Dominik Hašek|Dominik Hasek]], .925
 '''[[Mike Smith (ice hockey, born 1982)|Mike Smith]]''', .924
 [[Ben Bishop]], .924
 '''[[Jake Allen (ice hockey)|Jake Allen]]''', .924
 [[Johnny Bower]], .924
 '''[[Andrei Vasilevskiy]]''', .923
 [[Henrik Lundqvist]], .921
 '''[[Cam Talbot]]''', .921
 [[Miikka Kiprusoff]], .921
 '''[[Matt Murray (ice hockey, born 1994)|Matt Murray]]''', .921
 '''[[Connor Hellebuyck]]''', .921
 '''[[Jonathan Quick]]''', .921
 [[Ed Belfour]], .920
 [[Ron Tugnutt]], .919
 '''[[Robin Lehner]]''', .919
 '''[[Jaroslav Halák|Jaroslav Halak]]''', .919
 '''[[Carey Price]]''', .919
{{Div col end}}

Playoff: Minutes
{{Div col}}
 [[Patrick Roy]], 15,205
 [[Martin Brodeur]], 12,717
 '''[[Marc-André Fleury|Marc-Andre Fleury]]''', 10,106
 [[Ed Belfour]], 9,943
 [[Grant Fuhr]], 8,825
 [[Mike Vernon (ice hockey)|Mike Vernon]], 8,208
 [[Curtis Joseph]], 8,105
 [[Henrik Lundqvist]], 7,936
 [[Chris Osgood]], 7,651
 [[Billy Smith (ice hockey)|Billy Smith]], 7,637
 [[Andy Moog]], 7,444
 [[Dominik Hašek|Dominik Hasek]], 7,317
 [[Tom Barrasso]], 6,952
 [[Glenn Hall]], 6,892
 [[Ken Dryden]], 6,826
 [[Jacques Plante]], 6,646
 [[Tuukka Rask]], 6,541
 [[Turk Broda]], 6,387
 [[Terry Sawchuk]], 6,289
 '''[[Andrei Vasilevskiy]]''', 6,283
 [[Corey Crawford]], 6,053
 '''[[Braden Holtby]]''', 6,013
 [[Tony Esposito]], 5,991
 '''[[Jonathan Quick]]''', 5,635
 '''[[Carey Price]]''', 5,522
{{Div col end}}

Active leaders (goaltenders)

Regular season: Games played (active)
{{Div col}}
 [[Marc-André Fleury|Marc-Andre Fleury]], 939
 [[Jonathan Quick]], 712
 [[Carey Price]], 712
 [[Craig Anderson (ice hockey)|Craig Anderson]], 683
 [[Mike Smith (ice hockey, born 1982)|Mike Smith]], 670
 [[Sergei Bobrovsky]], 592
 [[Semyon Varlamov]], 560
 [[Jaroslav Halák|Jaroslav Halak]], 556
 [[Brian Elliott]], 521
 [[Braden Holtby]], 513
 [[Frederik Andersen]], 445
 [[James Reimer]], 433
 [[Cory Schneider]], 410
 [[Jonathan Bernier]], 404
 [[Cam Talbot]], 396
 [[Martin Jones (ice hockey)|Martin Jones]], 396
 [[Connor Hellebuyck]], 381
 [[John Gibson (ice hockey, born 1993)|John Gibson]], 378
 [[Jacob Markström|Jacob Markstrom]], 378
 [[Andrei Vasilevskiy]], 365
 [[Robin Lehner]], 364
 [[Jake Allen (ice hockey)|Jake Allen]], 353
 [[Thomas Greiss]], 347
 [[Darcy Kuemper]], 299
 [[Petr Mrazek]], 295
{{Div col end}}

Regular season: Wins (active)
{{Div col}}
 [[Marc-André Fleury|Marc-Andre Fleury]], 520
 [[Carey Price]], 361
 [[Jonathan Quick]], 359
 [[Sergei Bobrovsky]], 336
 [[Craig Anderson (ice hockey)|Craig Anderson]], 308
 [[Braden Holtby]], 299
 [[Mike Smith (ice hockey, born 1982)|Mike Smith]], 299
 [[Jaroslav Halák|Jaroslav Halak]], 285
 [[Brian Elliott]], 267
 [[Semyon Varlamov]], 261
 [[Frederik Andersen]], 261
 [[Andrei Vasilevskiy]], 229
 [[Connor Hellebuyck]], 201
 [[Cam Talbot]], 201
 [[Martin Jones (ice hockey)|Martin Jones]], 198
 [[James Reimer]], 192
 [[Cory Schneider]], 171
 [[Jacob Markström|Jacob Markstrom]], 169
 [[Jake Allen (ice hockey)|Jake Allen]], 168
 [[John Gibson (ice hockey, born 1993)|John Gibson]], 166
 [[Jonathan Bernier]], 165
 [[Thomas Greiss]], 155
 [[Robin Lehner]], 152
 [[Darcy Kuemper]], 143
 [[Petr Mrazek]], 140
{{Div col end}}

Regular season: Shutouts (active)
A goaltender achieves a [[shutout]] when he does not allow a goal against him, and plays the full game.
{{Div col}}
 [[Marc-André Fleury|Marc-Andre Fleury]], 71
 [[Jonathan Quick]], 56
 [[Jaroslav Halák|Jaroslav Halak]], 52
 [[Carey Price]], 49
 [[Mike Smith (ice hockey, born 1982)|Mike Smith]], 44
 [[Brian Elliott]], 43
 [[Craig Anderson (ice hockey)|Craig Anderson]], 42
 [[Sergei Bobrovsky]], 37
 [[Semyon Varlamov]], 36
 [[Braden Holtby]], 35
 [[Connor Hellebuyck]], 28 <br /> [[Andrei Vasilevskiy]], 28
 <li value="13"> [[Cam Talbot]], 27
 [[Cory Schneider]], 26
 [[Martin Jones (ice hockey)|Martin Jones]], 25 <br /> [[James Reimer]], 25 <br /> [[Darcy Kuemper]], 25
 <li value="18"> [[Petr Mrazek]], 24
 [[John Gibson (ice hockey, born 1993)|John Gibson]], 23 <br /> [[Frederik Andersen]], 23 <br /> [[Jake Allen (ice hockey)|Jake Allen]], 23
{{Div col end}}

Regular season: Saves (active)
{{Div col}}
 [[Marc-André Fleury|Marc-Andre Fleury]], 24,400
 [[Carey Price]], 19,304
 [[Craig Anderson (ice hockey)|Craig Anderson]], 19,099
 [[Mike Smith (ice hockey, born 1982)|Mike Smith]], 17,869
 [[Jonathan Quick]], 17,489
 [[Sergei Bobrovsky]], 15,911
 [[Semyon Varlamov]], 15,423
 [[Jaroslav Halák|Jaroslav Halak]], 14,390
 [[Braden Holtby]], 13,610
 [[Brian Elliott]], 12,347
 [[Frederik Andersen]], 12,094
 [[James Reimer]], 11,538
 [[Cam Talbot]], 10,677
 [[Connor Hellebuyck]], 10,658
 [[Jonathan Bernier]], 10,640
 [[Cory Schneider]], 10,568
 [[John Gibson (ice hockey, born 1993)|John Gibson]], 10,319
 [[Robin Lehner]], 10,202
 [[Andrei Vasilevskiy]], 10,147
 [[Jacob Markström|Jacob Markstrom]], 10,003
{{Div col end}}

Regular season: Save percentage (active)
[[Save percentage]] is the percentage of [[shot on goal (ice hockey)|shots on goal]] that a goaltender stops. It is calculated by dividing the number of saves by the number of shots on goal.

''Minimum 250 games played''
{{Div col}}
 [[Andrei Vasilevskiy]], .919
 [[Cory Schneider]], .918
 [[Darcy Kuemper]], .918
 [[Carey Price]], .917
 [[Robin Lehner]], .917
 [[Anton Khudobin]], .916
 [[Frederik Andersen]], .916
 [[Sergei Bobrovsky]], .916
 [[Semyon Varlamov]], .916
 [[Jaroslav Halák|Jaroslav Halak]], .916
 [[Connor Hellebuyck]], .916
 [[Cam Talbot]], .915
 [[Braden Holtby]], .915
 [[John Gibson (ice hockey, born 1993)|John Gibson]], .915
 [[Philipp Grubauer]] .914
 [[Marc-André Fleury|Marc-Andre Fleury]], .913
 [[James Reimer]], .913
 [[Jonathan Quick]], .913
 [[Jonathan Bernier]], .912
 [[Thomas Greiss]], .912
{{Div col end}}

Regular season: Goals against average (active)
[[Goals against average]] is the average number of goals a goaltender allows over a 60-minute period (the regulation length of a game). It is calculated by multiplying the ''goals against'' by 60 minutes, then dividing by the total minutes played.

''Minimum 250 games played''
{{Div col}}
 [[Jonathan Quick]], 2.42
 [[Cory Schneider]], 2.43
 [[Darcy Kuemper]], 2.48
 [[Jaroslav Halák|Jaroslav Halak]], 2.49
 [[Andrei Vasilevskiy]], 2.50
 [[Anton Khudobin]], 2.50
 [[Carey Price]], 2.51
 [[Philipp Grubauer]] 2.51
 [[Brian Elliott]], 2.53
 [[Sergei Bobrovsky]], 2.57
 [[Marc-André Fleury|Marc-Andre Fleury]], 2.57
 [[Frederik Andersen]], 2.59
 [[Braden Holtby]], 2.59
 [[Jake Allen (ice hockey)|Jake Allen]], 2.60
 [[Cam Talbot]], 2.63
 [[Petr Mrazek]], 2.64
 [[Semyon Varlamov]], 2.64
 [[John Gibson (ice hockey, born 1993)|John Gibson]], 2.67
 [[Martin Jones (ice hockey)|Martin Jones]], 2.68
 [[Connor Hellebuyck]], 2.69
{{Div col end}}

Regular season: Minutes
{{Div col}}
 [[Marc-André Fleury|Marc-Andre Fleury]], 54,392
 [[Carey Price]], 42,006
 [[Jonathan Quick]], 41,518
 [[Craig Anderson (ice hockey)|Craig Anderson]], 38,738
 [[Mike Smith (ice hockey, born 1982)|Mike Smith]], 38,260
 [[Sergei Bobrovsky]], 34,077
 [[Semyon Varlamov]], 32,098
 [[Jaroslav Halák|Jaroslav Halak]], 31,849
 [[Braden Holtby]], 29,408
 [[Brian Elliott]], 28,816
{{Div col end}}

Playoff: Games played (active)
{{Div col}}
 [[Marc-André Fleury|Marc-Andre Fleury]], 167
 [[Andrei Vasilevskiy]], 104
 [[Braden Holtby]], 97
 [[Jonathan Quick]], 92
 [[Carey Price]], 92
 [[Martin Jones (ice hockey)|Martin Jones]], 62
 [[Semyon Varlamov]], 60
 [[Frederik Andersen]], 53
 [[Matt Murray (ice hockey, born 1994)|Matt Murray]], 51
 [[Sergei Bobrovsky]], 51
{{Div col end}}

Playoff: Wins (active)
{{Div col}}
 [[Marc-André Fleury|Marc-Andre Fleury]], 92
 [[Andrei Vasilevskiy]], 63
 [[Braden Holtby]], 50
 [[Jonathan Quick]], 49
 [[Carey Price]], 45
 [[Martin Jones (ice hockey)|Martin Jones]], 32
 [[Semyon Varlamov]], 31
 [[Matt Murray (ice hockey, born 1994)|Matt Murray]], 29
 [[Frederik Andersen]], 27
 [[Craig Anderson (ice hockey)|Craig Anderson]], 24
{{Div col end}}

Playoff: Shutouts (active)
A goaltender achieves a [[shutout]] when he does not allow a goal against him, and plays the full game.
{{Div col}}
 [[Marc-André Fleury|Marc-Andre Fleury]], 16
 [[Jonathan Quick]], 10
 [[Carey Price]], 8
 [[Andrei Vasilevskiy]], 7
 [[Braden Holtby]], 7
 [[Matt Murray (ice hockey, born 1994)|Matt Murray]], 6 <br /> [[Cam Talbot]], 6 <br /> [[Martin Jones (ice hockey)|Martin Jones]], 6 <br /> [[Mike Smith (ice hockey, born 1982)|Mike Smith]], 6 
 <li value="10"> [[Petr Mrázek|Petr Mrazek]], 5
{{Div col end}}

Playoff: Goals against average (active)
[[Goals against average]] is the average number of goals a goaltender allows over a 60-minute period (the regulation length of a game). It is calculated by multiplying the ''goals against'' by 60 minutes, then dividing by the total minutes played.
''Minimum 25 games played''
{{Div col}}
 [[Jake Allen (ice hockey)|Jake Allen]], 2.06
 [[Braden Holtby]], 2.13
 [[Matt Murray (ice hockey, born 1994)|Matt Murray]], 2.18
 [[Robin Lehner]], 2.19
 [[Andrei Vasilevskiy]], 2.30
 [[Jonathan Quick]], 2.31
 [[Craig Anderson (ice hockey)|Craig Anderson]], 2.36
 [[Martin Jones (ice hockey)|Martin Jones]], 2.37
 [[Carey Price]], 2.39
 [[Semyon Varlamov]], 2.42
{{Div col end}}

Playoff: Saves (active)
{{Div col}}
 [[Marc-André Fleury|Marc-Andre Fleury]]''', 4,410
 [[Andrei Vasilevskiy]], 2,902
 [[Braden Holtby]], 2,675
 [[Jonathan Quick]], 2,514
 [[Carey Price]], 2,489
 [[Semyon Varlamov]], 1,625
 [[Martin Jones (ice hockey)|Martin Jones]], 1,586
 [[Frederik Andersen]], 1,489
 [[Craig Anderson (ice hockey)|Craig Anderson]], 1,487
 [[Mike Smith (ice hockey, born 1982)|Mike Smith]], 1,455 
{{Div col end}}

Playoff: Save percentage (active)
[[Save percentage]] is the percentage of [[shot on goal (ice hockey)|shots on goal]] that a goaltender stops. It is calculated by dividing the number of saves by the number of shots on goal.
''Minimum 25 games played''
{{Div col}}
 [[Craig Anderson (ice hockey)|Craig Anderson]], .929
 [[Braden Holtby]], .926
 [[Mike Smith (ice hockey, born 1982)|Mike Smith]], .924
 [[Jake Allen (ice hockey)|Jake Allen]], .924
 [[Andrei Vasilevskiy]], .923
 [[Cam Talbot]], .921
 [[Matt Murray (ice hockey, born 1994)|Matt Murray]], .921
 [[Connor Hellebuyck]], .921
 [[Jonathan Quick]], .921
 [[Robin Lehner]], .919
 [[Jaroslav Halák|Jaroslav Halak]], .919
 [[Carey Price]], .919
{{Div col end}}

Playoff: Minutes (active)
{{Div col}}
 [[Marc-André Fleury|Marc-Andre Fleury]], 10,106
 [[Andrei Vasilevskiy]], 6,283
 [[Braden Holtby]], 6,013
 [[Jonathan Quick]], 5,635
 [[Carey Price]], 5,522
 [[Martin Jones (ice hockey)|Martin Jones]], 3,646
 [[Semyon Varlamov]], 3,570
 [[Frederik Andersen]], 3,226
 [[Matt Murray (ice hockey, born 1994)|Matt Murray]], 3,083
 [[Craig Anderson (ice hockey)|Craig Anderson]], 2,901
{{Div col end}}

Coaches
The statistics listed include the [[2021–22 NHL season|2021–22 NHL regular season]] and the [[2022 Stanley Cup playoffs|2022 playoffs]].

All-time leaders (coaches)
Active coaches (during 2021–22 NHL season) are listed in '''boldface'''.

Regular season: Games coached
{{Div col}}
 [[Scotty Bowman]], 2,141
 [[Barry Trotz]], 1,812
 [[Joel Quenneville]], 1,768
 '''[[Paul Maurice]]''', 1,684
 '''[[Lindy Ruff]]''', 1,631
 [[Al Arbour]], 1,607
 [[Ken Hitchcock]], 1,598
 [[Dick Irvin|Dick Irvin, Sr.]], 1,448
 [[Ron Wilson (ice hockey, born 1955)|Ron Wilson]], 1,401
 [[Pat Quinn (ice hockey)|Pat Quinn]], 1,400
{{Div col end}}

Regular season: Coaching wins
{{Div col}}
 [[Scotty Bowman]], 1,244
 [[Joel Quenneville]], 969
 [[Barry Trotz]], 914
 [[Ken Hitchcock]], 849
 [[Al Arbour]], 782 <br> '''[[Lindy Ruff]]''', 782
 <li value="7">'''[[Paul Maurice]]''', 775
 [[Alain Vigneault]], 722
 '''[[Peter Laviolette]]''', 717
 [[Mike Babcock]], 700
{{Div col end}}

Regular season: Coaching points percentage
[[Winning percentage#National Hockey League|Points percentage]] is determined by the number of points a team earns (equal to the number of ties and overtime losses, plus twice the number of wins) divided by the total possible points (equal to twice the number of games).

''Minimum 200 games coached''
{{Div col}}
 [[Tom Johnson (ice hockey)|Tom Johnson]], .738
 [[Scotty Bowman]], .657
 '''[[Rod Brind'Amour]]''', .653
 '''[[Jon Cooper (ice hockey)|Jon Cooper]]''', .650
 [[Claude Ruel]], .648
 '''[[Bruce Boudreau]]''', .635
 '''[[Bruce Cassidy]]''', .635
 [[Toe Blake]], .634
 [[Floyd Smith]], .626
 '''[[Mike Sullivan (ice hockey)|Mike Sullivan]]''', .615
 [[Dan Bylsma]], .615
 [[Joel Quenneville]], .612
 [[Fred Shero]], .612
 [[Mike Babcock]], .608
 '''[[Craig Berube]]''', .607
 [[Gerry Cheevers]], .604
 [[Glen Sather]], .602
 [[Don Cherry (ice hockey)|Don Cherry]], .601
 [[Dave Lewis (ice hockey)|Dave Lewis]], .600
{{Div col end}}

Playoff: Games coached
{{Div col}}
 [[Scotty Bowman]], 353
 [[Joel Quenneville]], 225
 [[Al Arbour]], 209
 [[Dick Irvin|Dick Irvin, Sr.]], 190
 [[Pat Quinn (ice hockey)|Pat Quinn]], 183
 '''[[Darryl Sutter]]''', 182
 [[Mike Keenan]], 173
 [[Ken Hitchcock]], 168
 [[Mike Babcock]], 164
 [[Barry Trotz]], 162
 [[Alain Vigneault]], 155
 '''[[Peter Laviolette]]''', 154
 [[Pat Burns]], 149
 '''[[Jon Cooper (ice hockey)|Jon Cooper]]''', 139
 [[Glen Sather]], 126
 [[Claude Julien (ice hockey)|Claude Julien]], 124
 '''[[Peter DeBoer]]''', 123
 '''[[Lindy Ruff]]''', 120
 '''[[John Tortorella]]''', 120
{{Div col end}}

Playoff: Coaching wins
{{Div col}}
 [[Scotty Bowman]], 223
 [[Al Arbour]], 123
 [[Joel Quenneville]], 121
 [[Dick Irvin]], 100
 [[Mike Keenan]], 96
 [[Pat Quinn (ice hockey)|Pat Quinn]], 94
 '''[[Darryl Sutter]]''', 94
 [[Mike Babcock]], 90
 [[Glen Sather]], 89
 '''[[Ken Hitchcock]]''', 86
{{Div col end}}

Playoff: Coaching win percentage
''Minimum 25 games coached''

{{Div col}}
 [[Glen Sather]], .706
 [[Toe Blake]], .689
 [[Claude Ruel]], .667
 '''[[Jared Bednar]]''', .635
 [[Scotty Bowman]], .632
 [[Jean Perron]], .625
 [[Hap Day]], .613
 '''[[Jon Cooper (ice hockey)|Jon Cooper]]''', .604
 [[Larry Robinson]], .596
 [[Guy Boucher]], .595
{{Div col end}}

Stanley Cups
{{Div col}}
 [[Scotty Bowman]], 9
 [[Toe Blake]], 8
 [[Hap Day]], 5
 [[Al Arbour]], 4 <br /> [[Punch Imlach]], 4 <br /> [[Dick Irvin]], 4 <br /> [[Glen Sather]], 4
<li value="8"> [[Jack Adams]], 3 <br /> [[Pete Green (ice hockey)|Pete Green]], 3 <br /> [[Tommy Ivan]], 3 <br /> [[Joel Quenneville]], 3
{{Div col end}}

Active leaders (coaches)

Active Leaders section updated to end of 2021–22 season

Regular season: Games coached (active)
{{Div col}}
 [[Paul Maurice]], 1,684
 [[Lindy Ruff]], 1,631
 [[Darryl Sutter]], 1,397
 [[John Tortorella]], 1,383
 [[Peter Laviolette]], 1,348
{{Div col end}}

Regular season: Coaching wins (active)
{{Div col}}
 [[Lindy Ruff]], 782
 [[Paul Maurice]], 775
 [[Peter Laviolette]], 717
 [[Darryl Sutter]], 699
 [[John Tortorella]], 673
{{Div col end}}

Regular season: Coaching points percentage (active)
[[Winning percentage#National Hockey League|Points percentage]] is determined by the number of points a team earns (equal to the number of ties and overtime losses, plus twice the number of wins) divided by the total possible points (equal to twice the number of games).

''Minimum 200 games coached''
{{Div col}}
 [[Todd McLellan]], .657
 [[Rod Brind'Amour]], .653
 [[Jon Cooper (ice hockey)|Jon Cooper]], .650
 [[Bruce Boudreau]], .635
 [[Bruce Cassidy]], .635
{{Div col end}}

Playoff: Games coached (active)
{{Div col}}
 [[Darryl Sutter]], 182
 [[Peter Laviolette]], 154
 [[Jon Cooper (ice hockey)|Jon Cooper]], 139
 [[Peter DeBoer]], 123
 [[Lindy Ruff]], 120
{{Div col end}}

Playoff: Coaching wins (active)
{{Div col}}
 [[Darryl Sutter]], 94
 [[Jon Cooper (ice hockey)|Jon Cooper]], 84
 [[Peter Laviolette]], 78
 [[Peter DeBoer]], 68
 [[Lindy Ruff]], 66
{{Div col end}}

Stanley Cups (active)
{{Div col}}
 [[Jon Cooper (ice hockey)|Jon Cooper]], 2 <br /> [[Mike Sullivan (ice hockey)|Mike Sullivan]], 2 <br /> [[Darryl Sutter]], 2
 <li value="4"> [[Craig Berube]], 1 <br /> [[Jared Bednar]], 1 <br /> [[Peter Laviolette]], 1 <br /> [[John Tortorella]], 1
{{Div col end}}

Notes
{{Reflist}}

External links
 [http://www.nhl.com/ice/careerstats.htm?navid=NAV|STS|Career Career player statistics tables] from NHL.com
 [https://www.hockey-reference.com/leaders/ Leaders and Records Index] from hockey-reference.com
 [https://www.hockey-reference.com/coaches/NHL_stats.html NHL Coach Register] from hockey-reference.com

{{NHL topics}}

{{DEFAULTSORT:Statistical Leaders}}
[[Category:National Hockey League statistical records]]
[[Category:National Hockey League lists]]